Stepping Stones is a greatest-hits album released by Australian artist Wendy Matthews in March 1999. The album peaked at number 4 on the Australian charts. A DVD collection featuring all the music videos was also released.

Track listing

Charts

Weekly charts

Year-end charts

Certifications

References

Wendy Matthews albums
1999 greatest hits albums
Compilation albums by Australian artists